Nold is a surname. Notable people with the surname include:

Dick Nold (born 1943), American baseball player
Wendelin Joseph Nold (1900–1981), American Roman Catholic bishop
Werner Nold (born 1933), Canadian film editor